Erik A. Petschler (September 2, 1881 – December 10, 1945) was a Swedish stage and film actor and director.

Selected filmography
 The Monastery of Sendomir (1920)
 The Devil and the Smalander (1927)
 The Girl from Värmland (1931)
 Fridolf in the Lion's Den (1933)
 The Ghost Reporter (1941)
 Tonight or Never (1941)
 In Darkest Smaland (1943)
 I Am Fire and Air (1944)

References

Bibliography
 Hjort, Mette & Lindqvist, Ursula. A Companion to Nordic Cinema. John Wiley & Sons, 2016.
 Wallengren, Ann-Kristin.  Welcome Home Mr Swanson: Swedish Emigrants and Swedishness on Film. Nordic Academic Press, 2014.

External links

1881 births
1945 deaths
Swedish film directors
Swedish male film actors
Swedish male stage actors
People from Gothenburg